Dennstaedtia wilfordii is a species of fern in the family Dennstaedtiaceae. It was formerly placed in the monotypic genus Coptodipteris as Coptidipteris wilfordii. It is native from Pakistan through China to Korea and Japan.

Fungus Herpobasidium filicinum (Eocronartiaceae family, Platygloeales order) is found on the fern in Japan.

References

Dennstaedtiaceae
Flora of China
Plants described in 1861